The International Puppet Museum - Peruchet (Dutch: Internationaal Marionettenmuseum Peruchet; French: Musée International de la Marionette Peruchet) is a museum in Brussels, Belgium. It is part of the Royal Peruchet Theatre (Théâtre Royal du Peruchet). The theater has a history dating to 1929 and had its heyday in the 1960s when it staged hundreds of performances annually. The museum was established in 1938. The museum is located in an 18th-century farmhouse on Avenue de la Forêt in Ixelles, near the tram from the Boondael station.

Collection 
The museum displays a collection of thousands of marionettes from different countries and cultures worldwide. There are therefore many different types of puppets in the museum, which also vary in movement techniques (string puppets, hand puppets, water puppets, bunraku style puppets, shadow puppets, etc). There are contemporary puppets in the collection, but also pieces from the 18th century that were hand-crafted with great precision. The oldest puppets come from India.

History

Theater 
Carlo Speder founded the theater in 1929. The name "Peruchet" owes its origin to Speder's daughter who called it le théâtre de mon père chéri ("the theater of my dear loved father").  The theater moved a few times, first in 1931 to Joseph Lebeau Street in central Brussels, then in 1938 to the Chaussée de Charleroi.

The Académie de la marionnette ("Academy of Puppetry") was founded in 1940.  In 1950 Speder met Belgian puppeteer Franz Jageneau (1927-2010), an artist from the Hergé Studios. Jageneau became Speder's assistant and in 1958 he took over the management of the theater. He was also a set designer and made over 2000 marionettes.

In 1968 the firm relocated to Woudstraat (Avenue de la Foret), which is still its current address. In that year Jageneau met graduate playwright and theater director Biserka Assenova in Prague. She has specialized in the puppet theater of such major Czech practitioners as Erik Kolar and Jan Malík. At that time the theater performed more than two hundred performances annually in Belgium and elsewhere in Europe.

Nowadays, the theater continues to perform over 100 public shows a year as well as shows for schools. Apart from that, the theatre is well known for organising kids birthdays after the show. The repertoire contains most known fairy tales like Little Red Rinding Hood, Puss in Boots, Three Little Pigs, Sir Seguin Goat, The Curious Little Elephant, NutCracker, etc. The theatre also organises a festival (usually every other year) where well-known European masters play shows in their original language.

Museum 
In 1938, Carlo Speder created the museum.  In 1983, Jageneau and his family conceived the plan to breathe new life into the marionette collection by enlarging the museum. The museum is still located at the original address on Avenue de la Forêt.
International Puppet Museum Peruchet website

References

External links
 - International Puppet Museum official website

Museums in Brussels
Puppet museums